Cyphocarididae is a family of crustaceans belonging to the order Amphipoda.

Genera:
 Cyphocaris Boeck, 1871
 Procyphocaris Barnard, 1961

References

Amphipoda